"Shadow on the Wall" is the 15th television play episode of the second season of the Australian anthology television series Wednesday Theatre. It was recorded in 1967 as part of Australian Playhouse but did not air until 10 April 1968 in Melbourne and Sydney. as part of Wednesday Theatre. It was a rare contemporary Australian TV drama to address the Vietnam War. It ran for 30 mins.

Premise
In a North Vietnamese village, there is conflict between a local priest and the local political commissar.

Cast
 Allan Tobin as Captain Yun
 Keith Lee as the bishop
 Mark Albiston as Comissar Kin
 Lyndell Rowe as Lin Tan
 Farida Jauhari
 Richard Lee
 Suzette Jauhari

Production
It was filmed at ABC's studios in Ripponlea in April 1967 for Australian Playhouse but was not screened until the following year, when it aired as an episode of Wednesday Theatre.

Reception
The Age said it "might've been a good idea but it didn't come off" arguing the play was more suited to radio and that the actors and sets were not convincing and adding it "lacked conviction - and the climax was missed photographically."

References

External links
 

1968 television plays
1968 Australian television episodes
1960s Australian television plays
Australian Playhouse episodes
Wednesday Theatre (season 4) episodes